Rabot Glacier is a glacier in the Queen Elizabeth Range, flowing west from Mount Rabot between Mount Counts and Bartrum Plateau to enter Marsh Glacier. Named in association with Mount Rabot by the New Zealand Geological Survey Antarctic Expedition (NZGSAE), 1961–62.

Glaciers of the Ross Dependency
Shackleton Coast